= Hypertrichosis 1 (universalis, congenital) =

Genetic element in the species Homo sapiens

HTC1

Identifiers
- Aliases: HTC1, hypertrichosis 1 (universalis, congenital)
- External IDs: GeneCards: HTC1; OMA:HTC1 - orthologs
Orthologs
Species	Human	Mouse
Entrez	3341	n/a
Ensembl	n/a	n/a
UniProt	n a	n/a
RefSeq (mRNA)	n/a	n/a
RefSeq (protein)	n/a	n/a
Location (UCSC)	n/a	n/a
PubMed search		n/a
- Wikidata
View/Edit Human

Hypertrichosis 1 (universalis, congenital) is a protein that is encoded by the HTC1 gene in humans.
